Spring Beach is a rural locality in the local government area (LGA) of Glamorgan–Spring Bay in the South-east LGA region of Tasmania. The 2016 census recorded a population of 97 for the state suburb of Spring Beach.

History 
Spring Beach was gazetted as a locality in 1973.

Geography
The eastern boundary follows the shoreline of Mercury Passage.

Road infrastructure 
Route C320 (Rheban Road) passes through from north-east to south-east.

References

Towns in Tasmania
Localities of Glamorgan–Spring Bay Council